Saffronn Te Ratana (born 1975) is a visual artist of Māori (Ngāi Tuhoe) descent, born in Palmerston North, New Zealand. Te Ratana went to Palmerston Intermediate Normal School, followed by Palmerston North Girls’ High School. 

Her work PW 1 (Tiki remix) is included in the Museum of New Zealand Te Papa Tongarewea collections and as part of the 2013 Auckland Triennial celebrations, her work was acquired by the Auckland Art Gallery Toi o Tāmaki.

Education 
Te Ratana graduated from the Māori Visual Arts programme Toioho Ki Apiti at Te  Pūtahi-a-Toi, School of Māori Studies, Massey University. Following graduation she has remained involved with the university including as a tutor and lecturer in Māori visual arts.

Career 
Te Ratana works with mixed media, often creating three-dimensional structures using material such as fabrics, cardboard, wood, and fiberglass. She often works collaboratively with other artists, including creating works with her partner Ngataiharuru Taepa for over ten years. Co-created pieces include Ka kata te po (with Taepa & Hemi Macgregor, shown at the Te Manawa Art Gallery in 2011 then at the 5th Auckland Triennial) and Tu te manu ora i te Rangi (2008).

Considered a leading contemporary Māori artist, her works draw on her heritage and often comments on the suppression of tribal voices. Her work Ka kata te po (2011) is a response to the Urewera Raids of 2007. The piece Tu te manu ora i te Rangi explores Māori cosmology through legends of Tāne, Rehua, Ranginui and Papatūānuku, and the Māori creation myth.

Exhibitions 

While at university, Te Ratana participated in several high-profile group exhibitions including Purangiaho: Seeing Clearly (2001) at the Auckland Art Gallery Toi o Tāmaki and Taiāwhio: Continuity and Change (2002) at the Museum of New Zealand Te Papa Tongarewa.

Te Ratana's first solo exhibition, Pepeha, was at the Suter Art Gallery Te Aratoi o Whakatu in 2009. She exhibited alongside fellow Māori artists in the exhibition Whakarongo at the Tauranga Art Gallery. In 2014, she was part of the exhibition Five Māori Painters alongside Robyn Kahukiwa, Kura Te Waru Rewiri, Emily Karaka, and Star Gossage. Te Ratana's work in this exhibition reflected her experimental style by taking a three-dimensional approach to painting. She has also exhibited at the Thermostat Art Gallery and her work was included in the touring exhibition E Tū Ake: Standing Strong, with the exhibition visiting international venues including Québec, Paris, and Mexico City.

Personal life 
She currently lives and works in Palmerston North, New Zealand.

References

Further reading 
Artist files for Te Ratana are held at:
 Angela Morton Collection, Takapuna Library
 E. H. McCormick Research Library, Auckland Art Gallery Toi o Tāmaki
 Fine Arts Library, University of Auckland
 Hocken Collections Uare Taoka o Hākena
 Macmillan Brown Library, University of Canterbury
 Te Aka Matua Research Library, Museum of New Zealand Te Papa Tongarewa                                           
Also see:
 Interview with artist Saffronn Te Ratana by Auckland Art Gallery Toi o Tāmaki as part of the Five Māori Painters exhibition (2014).

1974 births
Living people
21st-century New Zealand women artists
New Zealand painters
New Zealand Māori artists
New Zealand women painters
Ngāi Tūhoe people
People from Palmerston North
Massey University alumni
Academic staff of the Massey University
People associated with the Museum of New Zealand Te Papa Tongarewa